Sir John Darell (1645–1694), of Calehill, Little Chart, Kent, was an English politician.

He was a Member (MP) of the Parliament of England for Maidstone in March 1679 and for Rye in October 1679, 1681, 1689 and 1690 – 24 January 1694.

References

1645 births
1694 deaths
Members of Parliament for Maidstone
People from Little Chart
English MPs 1679
English MPs 1680–1681
English MPs 1681
English MPs 1689–1690
English MPs 1690–1695